Kevin Bryan Mercado Lima (born 28 January 1995) is an Ecuadorian professional footballer for L.D.U. Quito who plays as a forward.

Club career
Born in Guayaquil, Mercado joined Academía Alfaro Moreno in 2005, aged ten. In 2011, he moved to giants LDU Quito, initially assigned to the youth setup.

On 11 August 2012, Mercado played his first match as a professional, coming on as a second-half substitute in a 0–0 away draw against Técnico Universitario, for the Ecuadorian Serie A championship. He scored his first professional goal on 12 May of the following year, netting his side's only in a 1–1 home draw against LDU Loja.

On 25 July 2014, Mercado and teammate Gabriel Corozo joined Granada CF, being assigned to the reserves in Segunda División B. On 13 February of the following year he was loaned to Godoy Cruz, until December.

On 7 December 2015, it was confirmed, that Mercado had signed a loan deal with CA Sarmiento, short after his return from another loan move.

On 2 February 2017 his loan to Sarmiento was ended and he was sent on loan to Bulgarian club CSKA Sofia for 1 year.

Career statistics

References

External links
  
 
 

1995 births
Living people
Sportspeople from Guayaquil
Ecuadorian footballers
Association football forwards
Ecuadorian Serie A players
Segunda División B players
First Professional Football League (Bulgaria) players
Liga MX players
L.D.U. Quito footballers
Club Recreativo Granada players
Godoy Cruz Antonio Tomba footballers
Club Atlético Sarmiento footballers
PFC CSKA Sofia players
C.D. Universidad Católica del Ecuador footballers
Club Necaxa footballers
2015 South American Youth Football Championship players
Ecuadorian expatriate footballers
Expatriate footballers in Spain
Ecuadorian expatriate sportspeople in Spain
Expatriate footballers in Argentina
Ecuadorian expatriate sportspeople in Argentina
Expatriate footballers in Bulgaria
Ecuadorian expatriate sportspeople in Bulgaria
Expatriate footballers in Mexico
Ecuadorian expatriate sportspeople in Mexico